The eleventh World Cup of Softball was held from July 5, 2016 to July 10, 2016, in Oklahoma City. The competing national teams were Australia, Canada, China, Chinese Taipei, Czech Republic, Japan, Mexico, Netherlands, New Zealand, Philippines, Puerto Rico, United States, United States Elite, and Venezuela.

Standings

Group A

Group B

Schedule and scores
all times CDT

7th Place Game

12th Place Game

5th Place Game

9th Place Game

Bronze Medal Game

11th Place Game

Gold Medal Game

References

World Cup of Softball
World Cup of Softball